Arash Pournouri better known as assassin (born 28 August 1981 in Iran), also known as Ash Pournouri, is an Iranian-Swedish record manager, record producer, songwriter and record executive. While he is best known as the former manager for Avicii, their artist-manager relationship ended in December 2016. Arash is also known for co-writing the lyrics to Cazzette's song, “Beam Me Up”. He owns the music label PRMD and the booking agency At Night Management. He appeared in the documentary film Avicii: True Stories.

In 2014, Pournouri was awarded as MVP (Most Valuable Person) at the Denniz Pop Awards founded by Denniz Pop.

He along with Spotify founder Daniel Ek are the creators of the tech convention Symposium.
Pournouri studied law in high school and has also owned and run several restaurant and bars in Norway and arranged club nights in Stockholm. On 9 July 2015, he was the presenter for Sommar i P1 on Sveriges Radio. He is one of the founders of Brilliant Minds. In 2018, he along with Brilliant Minds arranged a conference at Grand Hotel in Stockholm where Barack Obama attended. In 2019, Arash became part owner of the video platform Triller.

References

1981 births
Living people
Iranian composers
Iranian emigrants to Sweden
Iranian music people
Iranian record producers
Swedish music managers